The Witcher 3: Wild Hunt – Hearts of Stone is the first expansion pack for the 2015 video game The Witcher 3: Wild Hunt. Developed by CD Projekt Red, Hearts of Stone was released for PlayStation 4, Windows, and Xbox One on 13 October 2015, later released for the Nintendo Switch on 15 October 2019, with PlayStation 5 and Xbox Series X/S versions released on 14 December 2022. The expansion is an adaptation of the Polish folktale of Pan Twardowski, following Geralt of Rivia coming in contact with a mysterious man known as Gaunter O'Dimm, and his connections to Olgierd von Everec, a cursed nobleman.

Plot
Geralt takes up a contract sent out by a noble named Olgierd von Everec, who tasks him with eliminating a giant toad monster in the sewers of Oxenfurt. While hunting the monster, Geralt runs into Shani, a medic and an old acquaintance of his, whom he has the option of romancing. Geralt then kills the toad monster, only to find it was actually a cursed Ofieri prince. The prince's guards capture Geralt with the intention of executing him. While awaiting his execution en route to Ofier, Geralt is approached by the mysterious Gaunter O'Dimm. O'Dimm helps Geralt escape, but in return, Geralt must help O'Dimm recover a debt from von Everec, who had set up Geralt knowing the toad monster was an Ofieri prince. O'Dimm brands Geralt and tells him that according to terms of his contract with von Everec, he must fulfill three of von Everec's wishes. O'Dimm disappears and a strong storm  gets the boat to crash. While being handcuffed and taken as a prisoner by the Offieri, Geralt manages to escape. Geralt confronts von Everec and discovers that von Everec had obtained immortality at the cost of his emotions, giving him a "Heart of Stone". He admits to cursing the Ofieri prince since he was arranged to marry his true love, Iris, and that he wished for immortality in order to be with her. He then tells Geralt his three wishes: to entertain his brother Vlodimir for one night, to get revenge on the Borsodi family by obtaining Maximilian Borsodi's house, and to obtain the violet rose he had given to Iris. O'Dimm tells Geralt that the three tasks are meant to be impossible, as Maximilian Borsodi's house is kept in a highly secure vault, and both Vlodimir and Iris have been dead for years, but despite that, he agrees to assist Geralt.

With O'Dimm's help, Geralt allows Vlodimir's spirit to possess his body for one night, allowing him to attend a wedding party and fulfilling the first wish. O'Dimm banishes Vlodimir when the task is done, implying that he has powerful magic. Geralt then participates in a heist to steal Maximilian Borsodi's house from its vault and finds that it contains a will that would grant the entire Borsodi fortune to charity, fulfilling von Everec's revenge and second wish. To obtain Iris' rose, Geralt enlists the help of two demonic entities that resemble a cat and a dog to gain access to a supernatural realm where he witnesses von Everec and Iris' past. There, he learns that due to his "Heart of Stone," von Everec could not genuinely love Iris, and she died neglected and unhappy. Geralt, based on the player's choice, can either obtain the rose from Iris' spirit in order to free her from being "pinned" into the world or let the rose remain with her. Either way, Geralt fulfills von Everec's last wish and goes to meet with him. Along the way, he learns that O'Dimm is, in fact, an ancient entity of pure evil that relishes tricking people into trading away their souls in return for granting wishes that, unknown to the recipients, contain harmful side effects. When Geralt meets with von Everec, the three wishes are fulfilled, and O'Dimm arrives to collect von Everec's soul.

At this point, Geralt has the option of allowing O'Dimm to take von Everec's soul or intervening to save von Everec. If Geralt does nothing, O'Dimm kills von Everec, takes his soul, and rewards Geralt with one wish. If Geralt intervenes, he challenges O'Dimm by wagering his own soul to save von Everec. After Geralt solves O'Dimm's riddle, O'Dimm is forced to release both Geralt and von Everec from their pacts. Von Everec, now mortal again, regains his emotions and immediately feels regret for his past actions and mistakes. He gives Geralt his family sword and promises to start a new life free from O'Dimm's control.

Gameplay 
Gameplay does not differ much from the base game apart from a different story and exclusive quests. The expansion contains several new weapons and items, for example, the Runewright system, where Oferi craftsmen offer Runes (upgrades for weapons and armor) to the player in exchange for money.

Release
On 7 April 2015, CD Projekt announced two expansion packs for The Witcher 3: Wild Hunt— the first expansion being Hearts of Stone and the second being Blood and Wine. Hearts of Stone was released on 13 October 2015.

Reception

Hearts of Stone received highly positive reviews from critics, with the PlayStation 4 and Xbox One versions garnering "Universal Acclaim", according to the review aggregator website Metacritic. The game scored a 9/10 from reviewers at both IGN and GameSpot.

References

External links
 

2015 video games
Action role-playing video games
Open-world video games
PlayStation 4 games
The Witcher (video game series)
Video games developed in Poland
Video game expansion packs
Windows games
Xbox One games
CD Projekt games
Video games scored by Marcin Przybyłowicz